Lasthenia gracilis, the needle goldfields, is an annual plant with yellow flowers that grows in California and Arizona in southwestern United States, and Baja California in northwestern Mexico. It is in the genus Lasthenia of the family Asteraceae.

Description
The disk flowers are numerous.

References

External links

gracilis
Flora of California
Flora without expected TNC conservation status